In homological algebra, a branch of mathematics, a matrix factorization is a tool used to study infinitely long resolutions, generally over commutative rings.

Motivation 
One of the problems with non-smooth algebras, such as Artin algebras, are their derived categories are poorly behaved due to infinite projective resolutions. For example, in the ring  there is an infinite resolution of the -module  whereInstead of looking at only the derived category of the module category, David Eisenbud studied such resolutions by looking at their periodicity. In general, such resolutions are periodic with period  after finitely many objects in the resolution.

Definition 
This can be encoded more generally as a  graded -module  with an endomorphism such that .

Examples 

Periodicity 
definition

Main theorem 
Given a regular local ring  and an ideal  generated by an -sequence, set  and let

be a minimal -free resolution of the ground field. Then  becomes periodic after at most  steps. https://www.youtube.com/watch?v=2Jo5eCv9ZVY

Maximal Cohen-Macaulay modules 
page 18 of eisenbud article

Categorical structure

Support of matrix factorizations

See also 

 Derived noncommutative algebraic geometry
 Derived category
 Homological algebra
 Triangulated category

References

Further reading 

 Homological Algebra on a Complete Intersection with an Application to Group Representations
 Geometric Study of the Category of Matrix Factorizations
 https://web.math.princeton.edu/~takumim/takumim_Spr13_JP.pdf
 https://arxiv.org/abs/1110.2918

Homological algebra